CSTCC may refer to:

Chattanooga State Technical Community College
Cincinnati State Technical and Community College